Events in the year 1942 in the British Mandate of Palestine.

Incumbents
 High Commissioner – Sir Harold MacMichael
 Emir of Transjordan – Abdullah I bin al-Hussein
 Prime Minister of Transjordan – Tawfik Abu al-Huda

Events

 January – The Stern Gang kill two members of the Histadruth.
 12 February – Avraham Stern, the leader of the Lehi underground Zionist group, is assassinated by British Intelligence officers, who storm the Tel Aviv apartment in which he is hiding, tie him up and shoot him.
 May – The Tel Aviv Central Bus Station opens to the public.
 6–11 May – The Biltmore Conference, held in New York City at the prestigious Biltmore Hotel with 600 delegates and Zionist leaders from 18 countries attending, makes a fundamental departure from traditional Zionist policy and demands "that Palestine be established as a Jewish Commonwealth" (state), rather than a "homeland."  This sets the ultimate aim of the movement.
 2 August – The British form the Palestine Regiment, consisting of one Arab and three Jewish battalions. Initially, the Regiment is principally involved in guard duties in Egypt and North Africa. The British also want it to undermine efforts of Hajj Amin al-Husayni, who is working to obtain Arab support for the Axis Powers against the Allies.

Unknown date
 Ihud, a Jewish political party, established.

Notable births
 21 January – Yigal Bibi, Israeli politician
 12 February – Ehud Barak, the 13th Chief of Staff of the IDF and former Prime Minister of Israel
 28 February – Dorit Beinisch, Israeli jurist, President of the Israeli Supreme Court
 2 March – Meir Ariel, Israeli singer and poet (died 1999)
 19 March – Ran Goren, Israeli general and fighter pilot
16 April – Zvi Arad, Israeli mathematician (died 2018)
 28 May – Eliezer Rivlin, Israeli jurist, judge on the Israeli Supreme Court
 6 June – Gideon Toury, Israeli scholar (died 2016)
 4 July – Micha Ram, Israeli military officer, commander of the Israeli Navy (died 2018)
 4 July – Uriel Reichman, Israeli politician and professor of law, founder of IDC Herzliya
 6 August – Ron Nachman, Israeli politician, founder and first mayor of Ariel (died 2013)
 24 August – Reuven Gal, Israeli psychologist
 1 September – Michael Ben-Yair, Israeli jurist, Attorney General of Israel
 2 September – Yossi Vardi, Israeli entrepreneur 
 19 November – Amihai Mazar, Israeli archaeologist
 7 December – Ehud Kalai, Israeli-American game theorist
Full date unknown
Itamar Rabinovich, Israeli diplomat

Notable deaths

 3 January – Pinhas Rutenberg (born 1879), Ukrainian-born Palestinian Jew who was the founder of The Palestine Electricity Corporation
 12 February – Avraham Stern (born 1907), Polish-born Palestinian Jew who was the leader of the Lehi

References

 
Years in Mandatory Palestine
Mandatory Palestine in World War II